The Breagh gas field is a natural gas reservoir and production facility in the UK sector of the southern North Sea. It is about 100 km of east of Teesside and started gas production in 2013.

The field 
The Breagh field extends over UK offshore Blocks 42/13a and 42/12a. The field was discovered in July 1997 by well 42/13-2. The reservoir is a Lower Carboniferous Sandstone formation and has reserves of 600 billion cubic feet.

The Breagh gas field is jointly owned by INEOS (70%) and Sterling Resources (30%), INEOS operates the infrastructure. RWE Dea was the original 70% owner and operator but this interest was transferred to INEOS in 2015.

Development 
Production from the field is developed in stages. In the first stage gas is produced by wells on the offshore platform Breagh Alpha and then via pipeline to the Teesside Gas Processing Plant at Seal Sands. Later stages will entail development of the eastern part of the field produced back to a new Breagh Bravo platform.

Details of the Breagh A field infrastructure are as shown.

The export pipeline from Breagh runs 100 km to shore at Coatham Sands. From here a 10 km onshore pipeline carries gas to the Teesside Gas Processing Plant (TGPP).

The entry specification for 3rd party gas into the export pipeline is:

In addition to the Breagh offshore facilities a new gas process facility was constructed at Seal Sands, the Teesside Gas Processing Plant which received and treated the gas prior to shipment into the National Transmission System.

Production 
Gas production from the Breagh field was as follows. in million standard cubic feet (MMSCF).Data for 2021  is for January to October inclusive.

See also 

 Central Area Transmission System
 List of oil and gas fields of the North Sea

References 

Natural gas fields in the United Kingdom
North Sea energy